San Esteban de Nogales is a municipality located in the province of León, Castile and León, Spain. According to the 2004 census (INE), the municipality has a population of 350 inhabitants.

The Cistercian Monastery of Santa María de Nogales is located in this municipal term. It was built in 1150 and abandoned in the 19th century.

References

External links

Real Monasterio de Santa María de Nogales

Municipalities in the Province of León
Tierra de La Bañeza